Eriosemopsis is a monotypic genus of flowering plants in the family Rubiaceae. It was described by Walter Robyns in 1928 and no changes have been made since then. The genus contains only one species, viz. Eriosemopsis subanisophylla, which is endemic to KwaZulu-Natal, South Africa. The species is morphologically  similar to the species Pygmaeothamnus zeyheri but differs by having a thick indumentum, raised venation and elliptical leaves.

References

External links 
 World Checklist of Rubiaceae
 Eriosemopsis subanisophylla in Red List of South African Plants

Vanguerieae
Monotypic Rubiaceae genera
Taxa named by Frans Hubert Edouard Arthur Walter Robyns